Natalia Grigoryevna Kushnir (born May 6, 1954) is a former Soviet volleyball player and Olympic silver medalist.

Kushnir, who is Jewish, was born in Moscow, Russia.  She played volleyball for Lokomotiv Moskva, and for the Soviet Union.

Kushnir and the Soviet Union team won the team gold medal in volleyball at the 1971 European Championships.  She and the Soviet team won a silver medal at the 1976 Olympics in Montreal, losing to Japan in the finals.

See also
List of Jewish volleyball players

References

External links
Sports-reference bio
Jews in Sports bio

1954 births
Living people
Soviet women's volleyball players
Russian women's volleyball players
Olympic volleyball players of the Soviet Union
Olympic silver medalists for the Soviet Union
Olympic medalists in volleyball
Volleyball players at the 1976 Summer Olympics
Medalists at the 1976 Summer Olympics
Sportspeople from Moscow
Jewish women's volleyball players
Soviet Jews
Russian Jews